Halton is a constituency in Cheshire, represented in the House of Commons of the UK Parliament since 1997 by Derek Twigg of the Labour Party.

Creation
Halton was created for the 1983 general election following the major reorganisation of local authorities under the Local Government Act 1972, which came into effect on 1 April 1974. The constituency name refers to the Halton barony and covers the majority of the borough of the same name. It sits on either side of the River Mersey and comprises Widnes, the original town of Runcorn (with a small part of the new town) and Hale village.

The larger, northern part of the constituency comprised the former municipal borough of Widnes and the parish of Hale, which were part of the abolished Widnes constituency. The smaller, southern part comprised the majority of the former urban district of Runcorn (excluding Daresbury and Norton), which had been part of the abolished constituency of Runcorn.

Boundaries 

1983–1997: The Borough of Halton wards of Appleton, Broadheath, Castlefields, Ditton, Farnworth, Grange, Hale, Halton, Halton Brook, Heath, Hough Green, Kingsway, Mersey, Victoria, and Weston.

1997–2010: The Borough of Halton wards of Appleton, Broadheath, Ditton, Farnworth, Grange, Hale, Halton, Halton Brook, Heath, Hough Green, Kingsway, Mersey, and Riverside.

Eastern part, including Castlefields ward transferred to the new constituency of Weaver Vale.

2010–present: The Borough of Halton wards of Appleton, Birchfield, Broadheath, Castlefields, Ditton, Farnworth, Grange, Hale, Halton Brook, Halton View, Heath, Hough Green, Kingsway, Mersey, and Riverside.

Castlefields ward transferred back from Weaver Vale.

Political history 
Halton is considered a safe seat for the Labour Party. Its most marginal election result, a 12.8% majority, was the earliest in 1983, the year of Margaret Thatcher's first landslide victory,  — three elections later that majority had risen to 53.2% of the vote. It has otherwise, to date, proven a statistical safe seat for the Labour Party's incumbent MPs, of which there have thus far been two. The 2015 result made the seat the 22nd safest of Labour's 232 seats by percentage of majority.

Of the two forerunner seats, Widnes was last won by another party in 1935, whilst Runcorn had Conservative representation from its creation in 1950 to 1983, when it was abolished.

Members of Parliament

Elections

Elections in the 2010s

Elections in the 2000s

Elections in the 1990s

Elections in the 1980s

See also 

 List of parliamentary constituencies in Cheshire
History of parliamentary constituencies and boundaries in Cheshire

Notes

References

Parliamentary constituencies in North West England
Parliamentary constituencies in Cheshire
Constituencies of the Parliament of the United Kingdom established in 1983